Henrik Olof Stenson (born 5 April 1976) is a Swedish professional golfer.

He is the first male Swedish and first male Nordic major champion, having won the 2016 Open Championship at Royal Troon with a major championship record score of 264. His list of wins also includes some of the other most prestigious tournaments around the world; The Players Championship, WGC-Accenture Match Play Championship, the World Cup, the Tour Championship, the DP World Tour Championship, Dubai, the South African Open and Nedbank Golf Challenge.

A two-time European Tour Golfer of the Year (2013 and 2016), he has spent over 300 weeks ranked in the top ten of the Official World Golf Ranking and his career high world ranking of second is the best by any male Swedish golfer.

In 2013, Stenson won the U.S. PGA Tour's FedEx Cup and the European Tour's Race to Dubai, thus becoming the first player to win both and to win the season finales of both tours.

Stenson had been named the 2023 European Ryder Cup captain, but his captaincy was later terminated.

Early life
Stenson was born in Gothenburg. At age 12, he had his first golf lesson with local pro Richard Bayliss at Gullbringa Gullbringa Golf & Country Club, in Kungälv, north of Gothenburg in September 1988. With parents not playing golf at the time, he first tried the game after following a friend to the course. A natural left-hander, Stenson learned to play golf right-handed.

In 1991, he moved with his parents to Bjärred outside Malmö in southern Sweden and became a member of Barsebäck Golf & Country Club. He reached a handicap of 5 at age 15, scratch at 18 and played in junior and amateur tournaments in Sweden in his teen years.

Amateur career
At age 18, Stenson first represented Sweden in an international championship, at the 1994 European Boys' Team Championship, his team losing in a tight final against England.

In 1996, he won the Italian Open Amateur Match-play Championship, beating Robert-Jan Derksen, Netherlands, 5 and 3 in the 36-hole final.

In 1998, he played eight tournaments, as an amateur, on the professional Telia Tour, with five top-10 finishes. At the last tournament, the Telia Grand Prix, he led by two strokes with two holes to go, but finished fourth.

His achievements during 1998 earned him a place in the Swedish team at the 1998 Eisenhower Trophy in Santiago, Chile, were the Swedish team finished 6th and Stenson was the best Swedish player, finishing 14th individually.

Professional career

1999–2012
Stenson turned professional in late 1998 and the following year topped the money rankings on the second tier golf tour in Europe, the Challenge Tour. He joined the main European Tour in 2001, and that year, he won the Benson & Hedges International Open for his first European Tour victory. Each year from 2005 to 2008, he finished in the top 10 of the European Tour Order of Merit.

Stenson reached the top 20 of the Official World Golf Ranking in 2006 and the top 10 in 2007. In February 2007, Stenson became the first Swede to win one of the World Golf Championships when he beat Geoff Ogilvy 2&1 in the final of the WGC-Accenture Match Play Championship. This victory took Stenson to the top of the European Order of Merit and to fifth in the world rankings, which was also the highest a male Swedish player had ever been ranked, surpassing Jesper Parnevik's previous record of reaching seventh place in May 2000. In all, Stenson spent over 100 weeks in the top 10 of the rankings between 2007 and 2010. Stenson failed to add to his success over the rest of the season and finished in fourth place on the 2007 European Tour Order of Merit.

Stenson made his Ryder Cup debut in 2006, and after getting a half-point in the foursomes against Stewart Cink and David Toms on the Friday, he holed the winning putt and ensured that Europe won the Ryder Cup for a third consecutive time when he beat Vaughn Taylor 4 & 3 in the Sunday singles. He played again in 2008 at Valhalla, tallying a win, a loss and a draw in the foursomes. However he was not as fortunate as two years before, losing the singles on Sunday 3 & 2 to Kenny Perry.

In March 2009 Stenson created a storm in the media after stripping to his underwear and golf glove in order to play a recovery shot from a muddy water hazard at the first round of the WGC-CA Championship. On 10 May 2009, Stenson won The Players Championship with a dominating final round score of 66 to finish four ahead of Ian Poulter. The win was his first American stroke play victory. This win again brought him to fifth in the Official World Golf Ranking. The following week he moved up to fourth without playing. Stenson faltered after reaching a career OWGR high. He struggled during most of the 2011 season, when he made 9 of 15 cuts but had no top-10 finishes. His world ranking fell to 230 at the beginning of 2012.

On 5 April 2012, Stenson led during the first round of the Masters Tournament with two eagles on the front nine to lead at 6-under-par until the 18th hole. He scored a quadruple-bogey on the par-4 18th hole, tying the Masters' record for the highest score ever on that hole.

2013

In 2013, a resurgent Stenson had a watershed season, scoring a number of victories and high-place finishes while cementing a reputation as one of golf's best ball-strikers. In the 2013 Open Championship at Muirfield, Stenson finished as the runner-up, three strokes behind Phil Mickelson, with a total of 284 (E) for the tournament. He shot a final round of 70 and held the lead for brief moments during the round, but was beaten by Mickelson's four birdie finish. This was Stenson's best performance in a major championship, bettering his two previous T3 finishes at the same championship. Stenson moved back inside the world's top 20 with this result. Stenson finished runner-up again the following month at the WGC-Bridgestone Invitational behind Tiger Woods. He moved up to 11th in the world rankings after that result.

In the year's next major championship, the 2013 PGA Championship, Stenson contended again on Sunday, teeing off in the penultimate group, with fellow country-man Jonas Blixt, two strokes behind the leader Jim Furyk. Despite an eagle on the par-5 fourth hole that moved him to within one stroke of the leaders, Stenson was never quite able to build any momentum in an even-par round that included four bogeys. He finished alone in third place, three strokes behind the champion Jason Dufner. Stenson moved up one place in the world rankings to move back inside the world's top ten.

Stenson's good form continued into the 2013 FedEx Cup Playoffs, when he won the Deutsche Bank Championship by two strokes over runner-up, Steve Stricker. It was the Swede's first PGA Tour victory in over three years. He tied the tournament record of −22 en route to his third career PGA Tour win. The win vaulted him into first place in the FedEx Cup standings just ahead of Tiger Woods.

On 22 September 2013, Stenson won The Tour Championship at East Lake Golf Club and the FedEx Cup. He also tied his career best OWGR ranking of 4th.

He then moved up to a career best 3rd in the OWGR ranking on 3 November 2013. He finished the 2013 season ranked first on the PGA Tour in greens in regulation, first in ball striking, second among money leaders, third in total driving, fourth in scoring average, and seventh in driving accuracy percentage.

On 17 November 2013, he won the DP World Tour Championship, Dubai with a record-breaking performance (an aggregate 263 score at 25-under par), thereby also winning the Race to Dubai which he was already leading. Having already won the FedEx Cup Series in September, he thus became the first player to win the FedEx Cup on the PGA Tour and the European Tour's Race to Dubai, and the only player (as of 9/2020) to do so in the same season, a "historic double". Stenson described his feat as a "double-double" because in the process of winning these two seasonal points crowns, he also won the season finales of both tours (the Tour Championship and the DP World Tour Championship, Dubai). He was later named European Tour Golfer of the Year.

2014
In May 2014, Stenson reached a career high ranking of number two in the world, trailing only Adam Scott. On the PGA Tour, Stenson achieved career-best finishes at the Masters (T14) and U.S. Open (T4) while tying a career-best finish at the PGA Championship (T3). In Europe he won for the second time the DP World Tour Championship in Dubai and recorded 2nd places at the Volvo World Match Play Championship and BMW International Open, en route to a final 2nd place in the Race to Dubai, behind the winner Rory McIlroy.

2015 
In 2015, Stenson did not win any professional tournaments but made the cut in all 16 PGA Tour events he entered. He scored four runner-up finishes, including three over the final month of the season. He finished as the overall runner-up for the FedEx Cup.

On the European Tour he registered a runner-up finish at the BMW International Open, just as he did in 2014.

2016 
At the 2016 U.S. Open, on Saturday morning Stenson failed to show up at Oakmont to complete his second round, where he was going to miss the cut. The USGA said Stenson did not give a reason for his withdrawal, but he later confirmed on Twitter that he had "minor neck and knee issues".

A week later, he became the fourth two-time winner of the BMW International Open and the first to win the event at two different locations (at the Golfclub München Eichenried in 2006; at the Golf Club Gut Lärchenhof in 2016). The 2016 win at the tournament marked his 10th career win on the European Tour.

Stenson won the 2016 Open Championship at Royal Troon for his first major title. Before this win, he had achieved eight top 6-finishes in majors, without a win. He held the 54-hole lead going into the final round with a margin of one stroke over Phil Mickelson. The pair played together during the third round and finished it by being six and five shots ahead of the field respectively, setting up a final head-to-head duel on Sunday. Stenson shot a 63 in the final round to tie Johnny Miller for the best ever final round of a major winner. His overall score of 264 set a record for the lowest score in any major championship. Stenson finished three shots ahead of Mickelson and 14 shots ahead of third-place finisher J. B. Holmes. Stenson became the first male Swede to win a major.

In August, Stenson represented Sweden at the 2016 Summer Olympics, where he won the silver medal; entering the final hole of the competition he was level with the eventual winner Justin Rose, but bogeyed the last hole while Rose made his birdie putt to win by two strokes. Had Stenson won, he would have claimed victories on all six continents on which golf is played, a feat Rose with the Olympic win, joined Hall of Fame members Gary Player, David Graham, Hale Irwin and Bernhard Langer.

Stenson won an automatic selection for the 2016 Ryder Cup at the Hazeltine National Golf Club in Chaska, Minnesota. In the competition he earned 2 points for Europe in 5 matches, winning the Friday fourball with Justin Rose by 5 and 4 against Jordan Spieth and Patrick Reed, and his single match against Spieth by 3 and 2.

In November 2016, Stenson won the Race to Dubai for a second time. Stenson led the European Tour in scoring average (69.14) for the first time in his career in 2016, which he has declared his best overall year to date. In December, Stenson was named European Tour Golfer of the Year for the second time in his career. He was also named 2016 Swedish Golfer of the Year, male and female. It was the fifth time he earned this award.

2017 
In August 2017, Stenson broke the aggregate scoring record at the Wyndham Championship (258), en route to winning the tournament by one stroke over Ollie Schniederjans.

2018 
At the 2018 Masters Tournament, Stenson finished tied for fifth place after 4 even rounds of 69, 70, 70 and 70 with total score −9. This result meant that he has managed to finish in the top 5 at all four major championships in his career. He also finished tied for sixth at the U.S. Open. He did not win any tournaments in an otherwise up-and-down year in which he faced several nagging injuries. However, Stenson rebounded with one of the finest performances of his career at the 2018 Ryder Cup. He went 3–0–0 in his matches to join Francesco Molinari as the only players in the combined 24-man field to finish the event undefeated and untied. In the Sunday singles matches of the event, Stenson defeated Bubba Watson 5 & 4 with six birdies and no bogey through fourteen holes, and tied Tony Finau with best score relative to par at 6-under.

Being plagued by elbow injury during the 2018 season, Stenson underwent a minor procedure on his elbow, causing him to miss WGC-HSBC Champions. In 2018, he managed to lead the PGA Tour in both driving accuracy and greens in regulation. It was for the first time someone has led the PGA Tour in both these stats since Calvin Peete did it for three straight seasons in 1981, 1982 and 1983.

2019 
In December 2019, Stenson won the Hero World Challenge by one stroke over Jon Rahm. It was his first tournament win in more than two years.

2022 
On 15 March, Stenson was announced as the 2023 European Ryder Cup captain.

In June, he finished tied-second and tied best male player at the Volvo Car Scandinavian Mixed, a mixed tournament with men and women playing from different tees, nine strokes behind winner Linn Grant, who became the first female winner on the European Tour.

In July, it was confirmed that Stenson had been removed from his position as European Ryder Cup captain, due to his imminent signing with LIV Golf. In his first appearance in the LIV Golf Invitational Series at Bedminster he won by two strokes from Dustin Johnson and Matthew Wolff.

On 22 September 2022, the Swedish Golf Association announced it was ending its partnership with Henrik Stenson, because of his relations with LIV Golf.

Personal life
Stenson married fellow Swede Emma Löfgren in Dubai ten years after meeting her at the University of South Carolina. In July 2007, his wife gave birth to the couple's first child, a daughter named Lisa. In 2010, the couple had their second child, a son named Kalle (Karl). They live in Lake Nona Golf & Country Club in Orlando, Florida.

Emma Löfgren's sister Sarah Skönby, has worked as Stenson's manager since 2008.

In 2014, Stenson announced that he had invested in PGA Sweden National, his first venture in golf course ownership.

Amateur wins
1996 Italian Open Amateur Championship

Professional wins (22)

PGA Tour wins (6)

European Tour wins (11)

1Co-sanctioned by the Asian Tour
2Co-sanctioned by the Sunshine Tour

European Tour playoff record (1–3)

Sunshine Tour wins (2)

1Co-sanctioned by the European Tour

Sunshine Tour playoff record (0–1)

Challenge Tour wins (3)

Challenge Tour playoff record (1–1)

LIV Golf Invitational Series wins (1)

Other wins (2)

Major championships

Wins (1)

Results timeline
Results not in chronological order in 2020.

CUT = missed the halfway cut
WD = withdrew
"T" indicates a tie for a place.
NT = No tournament due to COVID-19 pandemic

Summary

Most consecutive cuts made – 16 (2011 U.S. Open – 2016 Masters)
Longest streak of top-10s – 2 (four times)

The Players Championship

Wins (1)

Results timeline

CUT = missed the halfway cut
"T" indicates a tie for a place
WD = withdrew
C = Cancelled after the first round due to the COVID-19 pandemic

World Golf Championships

Wins (1)

Results timeline
Results not in chronological order prior to 2015.

1Cancelled due to COVID-19 pandemic

WD = Withdrew
QF, R16, R32, R64 = Round in which player lost in match play
NT = No tournament
"T" = tied
Note that the HSBC Champions did not become a WGC event until 2009.

PGA Tour career summary

*As of the 31 July 2022.

Team appearances
Amateur
Jacques Léglise Trophy (representing the Continent of Europe): 1994
European Boys' Team Championship (representing Sweden): 1994
European Youths' Team Championship (representing Sweden): 1996
European Amateur Team Championship (representing Sweden): 1997
Eisenhower Trophy (representing Sweden): 1998
St Andrews Trophy (representing the Continent of Europe): 1998 (winners)

Professional
Seve Trophy (representing Continental Europe): 2005, 2009
World Cup (representing Sweden): 2005, 2006, 2008 (winners), 2009
Royal Trophy (representing Europe): 2006 (winners), 2007 (winners), 2010 (winners), 2011 (winners), 2012
Ryder Cup (representing Europe): 2006 (winners), 2008, 2014 (winners), 2016, 2018 (winners)
EurAsia Cup (representing Europe): 2018 (winners)

Ryder Cup points record

See also
List of golfers with most European Tour wins

References

External links

Swedish male golfers
European Tour golfers
PGA Tour golfers
LIV Golf players
Winners of men's major golf championships
Ryder Cup competitors for Europe
Olympic golfers of Sweden
Golfers at the 2016 Summer Olympics
Medalists at the 2016 Summer Olympics
Olympic medalists in golf
Olympic silver medalists for Sweden
Swedish expatriate sportspeople in the United States
Sportspeople from Gothenburg
Golfers from Orlando, Florida
1976 births
Living people